Przemysław Słowikowski (pronounced ; born 20 November 1993) is a Polish sprinter. He won a silver medal in the 4 × 100 metres relay at the 2013 European U23 Championships.

International competitions

Personal bests
Outdoor
100 metres – 10.19 (+1.6 m/s, Jelenia Góra 2020)
200 metres – 20.78 (+0.9 m/s, Gdańsk 2015)
Indoor
60 metres – 6.69 (Spała 2018)
200 metres – 21.42 (Toruń 2018)

References

1993 births
Living people
Polish male sprinters
Sportspeople from Gdynia
European Athletics Championships medalists
21st-century Polish people